Pic Paradis or Pic du Paradis (Paradise Peak in English) is the highest point in a chain of hills in the Collectivity of Saint Martin, an overseas collectivity of France on the island of Saint Martin, located in the Caribbean, with an elevation of , making it the highest point on the island.

Important Bird Area

A 205 ha area, encompassing the forested western slopes of the peak from an altitude of 300 m to the summit, has been recognised as an Important Bird Area (IBA) by BirdLife International because it supports populations of bridled quail-doves, green and purple-throated caribs, Antillean crested hummingbirds, Caribbean elaenias, scaly-breasted and pearly-eyed thrashers and Lesser Antillean bullfinches.

References

External links
  Pic du Paradis, Fodor's Travel Guides.

Landforms of Saint Martin (island)
Geography of the Collectivity of Saint Martin
Important Bird Areas of the Collectivity of Saint Martin
Mountains of the Caribbean
Mountains of France